The 2019–20 Georgia Southern Eagles men's basketball team represented Georgia Southern University in the 2019–20 NCAA Division I men's basketball season. The Eagles, led by seventh-year head coach Mark Byington, played their home games at Hanner Fieldhouse in Statesboro, Georgia as members of the Sun Belt Conference. They finished the season 20–13, 12–8 in Sun Belt play to finish in a tie for fourth place. They were the No. 5 seed in the Sun Belt tournament, where they defeated Louisiana and Georgia State. However, the tournament was later cancelled amid the COVID-19 pandemic.

On March 20, head coach Mark Byington resigned to become the head coach at James Madison. He finished at Georgia Southern with a seven-year record of 131–97.

Previous season
The Eagles finished the 2018–19 season 21–12, 12–6 in Sun Belt play to finish in a 3-way tie for second place. They defeated Louisiana–Monroe in the quarterfinals of the Sun Belt tournament, before losing in the semifinals to UT Arlington. Despite having 21 wins, they did not participate in a postseason tournament.

Roster

Schedule and results

|-
!colspan=12 style=| Regular season

|-
!colspan=12 style=| Sun Belt tournament
|-

|- style="background:#bbbbbb"
| style="text-align:center"|Mar 14, 202011:30 am, ESPN+
| style="text-align:center"| (5)
| vs. (1) Little RockSemifinals
| colspan=2 rowspan=1 style="text-align:center"|Cancelled due to the COVID-19 pandemic
| style="text-align:center"|Smoothie King CenterNew Orleans, LA
|-

Source

References

Georgia Southern Eagles men's basketball seasons
Georgia Southern Eagles
Georgia Southern Eagles men's basketball
Georgia Southern Eagles men's basketball